Craig Andrew Wallace (born 12 June 1969) is an Australian politician. He was the member for Thuringowa in the Queensland State Parliament from 7 February 2004 to 24 March 2012.

He was the Minister for Main Roads and Fisheries and Marine Infrastructure until Labor lost the 2012 state election. He was defeated after falling into third place behind Katter's Australian Party nominee Steve Todeschini.

He previously served as Minister for Natural Resources and Water and Minister Assisting the Premier in North Queensland.

References

1969 births
Living people
Members of the Queensland Legislative Assembly
People from Townsville
Australian Labor Party members of the Parliament of Queensland
21st-century Australian politicians